was a district located in Yamaguchi Prefecture, Japan.

Towns and villages
 Kano

Merger
 On April 21, 2003 - The town of Kano, along with the cities of Tokuyama and Shinnan'yō, and the town of Kumage (from Kumage District), was merged to create the city of Shūnan. Tsuno District was dissolved as a result of this merger.

See also 
List of dissolved districts of Japan

Tsuno District
Shūnan, Yamaguchi